Calcimitra christinae is a species of sea snail, a marine gastropod mollusk in the family Mitridae.

Original description
   (of Mitra christinae Poppe, 2008) Poppe G.T. (2008) New Fissurellidae, Epitoniidae, Aclididae, Mitridae and Costellariidae from the Philippines. Visaya 2(3): 37-63. [Published August 2008] page(s): 41

References

Mitridae
Gastropods described in 2008